The small-eyed blind snake (Anilios micromma) is a species of snake in the Typhlopidae family.

References

Anilios
Reptiles described in 1981
Snakes of Australia
Taxobox binomials not recognized by IUCN